Larry Bruce Jones (December 18, 1933 – May 30, 2013) was an American football player and coach.  He served as the head coach at Florida State University from 1971 to 1973, compiling a record of 15–19.  A native of Little Rock, Arkansas, Jones played college football as a linebacker and center at Louisiana State University.  He also served as an assistant coach as his alma mater, LSU, and at the University of South Carolina, the United States Military Academy, the University of Tennessee and the University of Kansas.

He died in the morning of May 30, 2013. He was 79.

Head coaching record

References

1933 births
2013 deaths
American football centers
American football linebackers
Army Black Knights football coaches
Kansas Jayhawks football coaches
LSU Tigers football players
LSU Tigers football coaches
South Carolina Gamecocks football coaches
Tennessee Volunteers football coaches
Sportspeople from Little Rock, Arkansas
People from Pope County, Arkansas
Players of American football from Arkansas